A Mesa is one of seven parishes (administrative divisions) in the municipality of Grandas de Salime, within the province and autonomous community of Asturias, in northern Spain. 

The population is 32 (INE 2006).

Villages and hamlets
 A Mesa
 Buspol
 El Toucedo
 Valiamayor
 El Vilar de Buspol

References

Parishes in Grandas de Salime